is a Japanese announcer for Nippon TV.

Biography, personal life
She was born in Otofuke, Katō District, Hokkaido. After graduating from Hokkaido Obihiro Hakuyou High School, and Waseda University School of Commerce, she joined Nippon Television in 2016 at the same time as Ren Umezawa and Machiko Sato.

In her college days she won the Grand Prize in the beauty contest Student Heroes! Presents Fresh Campus Contest 2012. Her announcement school was TV Asahi Ask.

Current appearance programmes

Former appearances

TV dramas

References

External links
 

Japanese announcers
Waseda University alumni
People from Hokkaido
1993 births
Living people